A molybdenum cofactor is a biochemical cofactor that contains molybdenum.

Examples include:

 Molybdopterin (or, strictly speaking, the molybdopterin-molybdenum-complex), the organophosphate-dithiolate ligand that binds molybdenum and tungsten in most molybdenum- (except nitrogenases) and all tungsten-containing proteins
 FeMoco, a metal cluster that contains Fe, Mo, and S that is found in some nitrogenases